Prisoner 489 is a horror novella written by American author Joe R. Lansdale.

Synopsis 
On a prison island for the world's worst criminals, a prisoner is set for execution. After absorbing multiple surges of electricity and nearly knocking out power to the entire island, the prisoner dies. The prisoner is buried in the graveyard with a single marker bearing only three digits: 489. After the burial, a violent storm rocks the island and a staff member goes missing. The staff rushes into the storm searching for their lost comrade, but they instead discover that the burial site has been unearthed and the body is missing. With this horrific finding and the strange noises, the staff is unnerved. When the strange noises continue, the staff starts to think something is after them. Faced with an unknown threat, they soon must battle for their lives.

Publishing information

This book is published by Dark Regions Press and is available as a lettered edition (sold out), a limited edition hardcover, and trade paperback. This work is part of Dark Regions Black Labyrinth Book II series.

Artwork
The artwork and illustrations are by renowned Argentinian artist, Santiago Caruso.

References

External links
Author's official website
Artist's Official website
 Publisher's website

 Novels by Joe R. Lansdale
 American horror novels
 2014 American novels
 Novels set on islands
 Works by Joe R. Lansdale
Dark Regions Press books